Trevor Burns (born September 15, 2001) is an American professional soccer player who plays as a midfielder for USL League One club New England Revolution II via the New England Revolution academy.

Career

Youth
Burns spent seven years with the New England Revolution academy. He made an appearance for the club's USL League One side, New England Revolution II, on July 25, 2020, appearing as a 70th-minute substitute during a 0-0 draw with Union Omaha.

College
Burns has committed to playing college soccer at Georgetown University in 2020.

Personal
Trevor is the son of former professional soccer player Mike Burns, who played for Viborg FF, New England Revolution, San Jose Earthquakes, Kansas City Wizards, and earned 75 caps for the United States national team between 1992 and 1998. Mike Burns was also General Manager for New England between 2011 and 2019.

References

2001 births
Living people
People from Southborough, Massachusetts
Sportspeople from Worcester County, Massachusetts
Soccer players from Massachusetts
American soccer players
Association football midfielders

New England Revolution II players
USL League One players